André Henri Gobert (30 September 1890 – 6 December 1951) was a tennis player from France. Gobert is a double Olympic tennis champion of 1912. At the Stockholm Games, he won both the men's singles and doubles indoor gold medals.

Career
Gobert first started playing tennis at age 11.

He was a two-time winner of the French Championships in 1911 and 1920, when the tournament was only open to amateur tennis players who had a membership with a French tennis club. He also won the International Lawn Tennis Federation's World Covered Court Championship (Indoor Wood) in 1919. Also twice runner-up at the World Hard Court Championships on Clay (1913 and 1920). He won the indoor tennis gold medal at the 1912 Olympic Games. Gobert reached the Wimbledon all comers final in 1912, beating James Cecil Parke and Max Decugis, then lost to Arthur Gore.

He won the singles title at the British Covered Court Championships, played on wooden courts at the Queen's Club in London, five times; in 1911, 1912, 1920, 1921 and 1922. In 1910, he won the All England Plate at Wimbledon, the competition for players who were defeated in the first and second rounds of the singles competition.

Between 1912 and 1922, Gobert played for the French Davis Cup team in five ties and compiled a record of three wins and 11 losses.

Grand Slam finals

Doubles: 2 (1 titles, 1 runner-up)

References

External links
 
 
 
 

1890 births
1951 deaths
French Championships (tennis) champions
French male tennis players
Olympic gold medalists for France
Olympic tennis players of France
Tennis players from Paris
Tennis players at the 1912 Summer Olympics
Wimbledon champions (pre-Open Era)
Olympic medalists in tennis
Grand Slam (tennis) champions in men's doubles
Medalists at the 1912 Summer Olympics